Thomas Scott Kaplan (born September 14, 1962) is an American billionaire businessman, philanthropist and art collector.  Kaplan is the world's largest private collector of Rembrandt's works.

Kaplan is the chairman and chief investment officer of The Electrum Group LLC, a New York City-based investment, advisory and asset management firm with a focus on the natural resources sector. Since 2017, he has been the chairman of the International Alliance for the Protection of Heritage in Conflict Areas (ALIPH), a Geneva-based foundation established by France and the United Arab Emirates.

Early life and education
Born in New York City, Kaplan is the son of Lillian Jean Berger and Jason "Jay" Kaplan. He and his family are Jewish.

In his youth, he developed a passion for wildlife conservation and for Rembrandt, which decades later inspired him, respectively, to found the field conservation group Panthera, and to establish The Leiden Collection, the world's largest private grouping of works from the Dutch Golden Age. At Oxford University, Kaplan earned bachelor's, master's and doctoral degrees in history. He wrote his doctoral dissertation on the Malayan counterinsurgency and the manner in which commodities influence strategic planning. While earning his PhD, he worked as an analyst covering Israeli companies publicly traded in the U.S. On a business trip, he met his future wife, Dafna Recanati (the daughter of Israeli investor Leon Recanati), who had attended the same boarding school as Kaplan, Institut Le Rosey. Her mother, artist Mira Recanati, introduced him to Israeli investor Avi Tiomkin, who hired him as a junior partner in 1991. Kaplan had impressed Tiomkin by correctly predicting Saddam Hussein's 1990 invasion of Kuwait several years before it took place. When Tiomkin decided to concentrate his investments solely in Israel in 1993, Kaplan moved on to pursue his own entrepreneurial ventures.

Career
Inspired by Marc Faber, who held that precious metals were insurance against the "monetary foolishness" of central governments, Kaplan focused on natural resources investing. In 1993, he founded Apex Silver Mines to capitalize on the improving supply/demand fundamentals of metals. While he was chairman and chief executive officer of Apex, his team discovered and financed the San Cristobal deposit in Bolivia, now one of the largest producers of silver and zinc in the world. Kaplan retired from Apex Silver at the end of 2004 to focus on his new exploration projects.

In 2003, a company related to Kaplan became the largest investor in African Platinum Plc (then known as Southern African Resources Plc), enabling it to explore and develop one of the largest platinum group metals projects in South Africa. In 2007, Kaplan sold his position in African Platinum as part of a transaction in which the company was acquired by Impala Platinum Limited, at a valuation of $580 million.

Also in 2003, Kaplan founded Leor Exploration & Production LLC, which became the fastest-growing privately held hydrocarbon exploration and production company in the United States. In 2007, Leor’s natural gas assets were sold to Encana (now Ovintiv) for $2.55 billion.

Kaplan first began investing heavily in gold in 2000. Since the sales of African Platinum and Leor in 2007, Kaplan has focused on the Electrum Group. Its exploration arm, Electrum Ltd., which he co-founded with Dr. Larry Buchanan, owns a diversified international portfolio of gold exploration assets. Its other entities hold significant interests in several publicly traded companies, including NovaGold Resources and Gabriel Resources Ltd., two companies that own several of the largest proven gold resources in the world. Among its private interests, the Electrum Group is the controlling shareholder of Sunshine Silver Mining & Refining Corporation, which owns the Sunshine Mine in Idaho, the most prolific silver mine in U.S. history, as well as the Los Gatos silver-zinc deposit in Mexico, which it is developing in partnership with Dowa of Japan. Gatos Silver went public in October 2020, raising $170 million.

In August 2020, it was reported that Warren Buffett's Berkshire Hathaway had made an investment in Barrick Gold, NovaGold's joint venture partner in the Donlin Gold mine project in Alaska. This prompted Kaplan to recall the positive impact of Buffett's purchase of silver bullion at the time he was taking his silver mining company public in 1997.

As a leading investor in gold, Kaplan is credited with correctly predicting that gold prices would increase. His investment strategy and commitment to gold led Bloomberg Businessweek to refer to him as "Gold's Evangelist." He says his "mantra" is to "go for the great assets that give you tremendous underlying leverage to your theme... but only in jurisdictions that will allow you to keep the fruits of the leverage." Analysts have referred to his highlighting the importance of jurisdictional risks in the mining industry as the "Kaplan Doctrine".

Leiden Collection
Kaplan's passion for the Dutch masters began in his early childhood. Kaplan and his wife, Dafna Recanati Kaplan, began to collect the art of the Dutch Golden Age in 2003. In that year, they acquired their first Dutch painting:Gerrit Dou's jewel-like Portrait of Dirck van Beresteyn. Their Leiden Collection is now among the largest private assemblages of Dutch art in the world, and numbers more than 250 paintings and drawings, most of which are included in a free, high-resolution online catalogue. The Kaplans' intention was to establish a "lending library for old masters", including loans for special exhibitions as well as loans to bolster long-term installations. The Collection, including major works such as Self-Portrait with Shaded Eyes and Minerva in Her Study, was featured in a three-part documentary entitled "Looking for Rembrandt," which aired on the BBC in April 2019 on the occasion of the 350th anniversary of the master’s death. Minerva and Bust of a Bearded Man were among 35 pictures lent to the Hermitage Amsterdam for an exhibition of Leiden Collection works in early 2023. 

The Collection focuses on Rembrandt and his School, illuminating the personalities and themes that shaped the Golden Age over five generations. How the Collection developed is explained in Kaplan's personal account of the journey: "A Portrait in Oil". At the core of the Collection is a group of fifteen paintings and two drawings by Rembrandt himself, and key members of his circle including his teacher, Pieter Lastman, and studio-mate Jan Lievens. The collection includes a  1629-1630 Self-portrait of Lievens. It includes around 250 paintings and drawings, mainly by 17th-century artists based in Leiden. This includes thirteen paintings from all phases of the career of Gerard Dou, as well as A Young Woman Seated at the Virginals (1670–1672) by Johannes Vermeer and Hagar and the Angel by Carel Fabritius. A catalog of the Dou works in the collection, with technical analyses, appeared in 2014.  In January 2017 an online catalog of the collection went live, with information on over 175 of the works in the collection.

Gallery

The Five Senses by Rembrandt van Rijn
At a 2015 auction in Bloomfield, New Jersey a European bidder bought The Fainting Patient or Smell for $870,000, though its pre-auction estimate had only been $800. This was identified as an early work by Rembrandt, dating to 1624 and belonging to his The Five Senses series. The Leiden Collection then immediately acquired the work for $5 million, which was publicized in 2016. Prior to the purchase the collection already owned Hearing and Touch from the series, whilst Sight is in the Museum De Lakenhal in Leiden and the whereabouts of Taste is unknown. Smell bears Rembrandt's monogram (RF or RHF, Rembrandt Harmensz. fecit), representing the master's earliest known signature, and is similar in dimensions and style to the other known works in the series. The three Leiden Collection works were exhibited at the Getty Museum in 2016, and the complete extant set of four were reunited for shows at the Ashmolean Museum and Rembrandthuis in 2017.

Exhibitions 
Notable past and upcoming exhibitions of the Leiden Collection include:
 4 February 2023 - 27 August 2023, Rembrandt & His Contemporaries. History paintings from the Leiden Collection, Hermitage Amsterdam, Amsterdam
 14 February 2019 – 18 May 2019, Rembrandt, Vermeer and the Dutch Golden Age. Masterpieces from The Leiden Collection and the Musée du Louvre, Louvre Abu Dhabi, Abu Dhabi
 5 September 2018 – 13 January 2019, The Age of Rembrandt and Vermeer: Masterpieces of The Leiden Collection, The State Hermitage Museum, Saint Petersburg
 28 March 2018 – 22 July 2018, The Age of Rembrandt and Vermeer: Masterpieces of The Leiden Collection, Pushkin State Museum of Fine Arts, Moscow
 23 September 2017 – 25 February 2018, Rembrandt, Vermeer and Hals in the Dutch Golden Age: Masterpieces from The Leiden Collection, Long Museum West Bund, Shanghai
 17 June 2017 – 3 September 2017, Rembrandt and His Time: Masterpieces from The Leiden Collection, National Museum of China, Beijing
 22 February 2017 – 22 May 2017, Le siècle de Rembrandt, Louvre, Paris
 11 March 2014 – 31 August 2014, Gerrit Dou. The Leiden Collection from New York, Museum De Lakenhal, Leiden

Philanthropy and activism

Foreign policy
Kaplan is a member of the Council on Foreign Relations. He also belongs to the International Council of the Belfer Center for Science and International Affairs at Harvard University, where Kaplan, scholar Graham Allison and American General David Petraeus created the Recanati–Kaplan Foundation Fellows Program for intelligence officers from around the globe. All applicants must come with the personal recommendation of their agency heads. A similar program was established in 2020 at the Yale Jackson School of Global Affairs, the Petraeus-Recanati-Kaplan Fellowship, which brings select special military operators to Yale University for a one-year global affairs master's. In 2022, the Recanati-Kaplan Applied History Initiative was created at the Cambridge Middle East and North Africa Forum, a think-tank based at the University of Cambridge, "to inform Middle East policy with deep historical insight".

In 2018, along with French philosopher and activist Bernard-Henri Lévy, Kaplan co-founded Justice for Kurds (JFK), a New York-based, not-for-profit advocacy group that seeks to educate and raise public awareness about the Kurdish cause in the U.S. and globally. Kaplan serves as Chairman of the group. JFK’s Advisory Council features policymakers, journalists, intellectuals, diplomats, military commanders, and artists.

Kaplan, along with Sheldon and Miriam Adelson, contributed three-quarters of the 1.7 million dollar revenue of United Against Nuclear Iran (UANI) in 2013. In 2017 Kaplan gave a speech at a conference for the organization in which he compared Iran to a reticulated python devouring a goat as well as saying that the Iranian government because of their Shiite Muslim beliefs "pursue a strategy of 'taqiyya', or religious dissimulation" to conceal its imperial aims.

Community, culture, and antiquities
Kaplan served as president (2009–2012) and chairman of the board of directors (2012–2015) of the 92nd Street Y, a prominent Jewish community and cultural center in New York City. His wife Daphne and Robert Gilson conceived of the Recanati–Kaplan Program for Excellence in the Arts, which funds scholarships based on artistic merit for children and teens to study at the 92Y's School of the Arts.

In 2014, along with the Florence Gould Foundation, the Kaplans helped fund the creation of Albertine, a bookshop housed in the historic Payne Whitney House of the French Embassy on Fifth Avenue in New York City. Albertine has the largest collection of French-language books and English translations in the U.S. In 2022, Villa Albertine, a French government-sponsored residency program for artists and intellectuals in the U.S., launched the Recanati-Kaplan Prize to "support artistic and intellectual exchange between the United States, France, and the Arab world". The prize awards one recognized individual from the Arab world with a residency project in the U.S.

In 2015, after the passing of his boyhood friend, Simon Marsh, Kaplan parted with the two Spitfire Mark I fighter planes that he and Marsh had as partners restored with Historic Flying of Duxford, Cambridgeshire. The second of the planes, Spitfire N3200, was gifted in the presence of Prince William, the Duke of Cambridge, to the Imperial War Museum at Duxford, where it had last flown as the personal aircraft of the Commander of 19 Squadron, Geoffrey Dalton Stephenson, later personal pilot to King George VI. The first, Spitfire P9374, flown by Captain Peter Cazenove over Dunkirk, was sold at auction at Christies London, where it achieved a record price for any Spitfire at auction, the proceeds of which were donated for the benefit of the RAF Benevolent Society, Panthera, Oxford's WildCRU and Stop Ivory.

In 2017, Kaplan became the chairman of the International Alliance for the Protection of Heritage in Conflict Areas (ALIPH), a Geneva-based foundation dedicated to the implementation of preventive, emergency response, and restoration programs for cultural property in danger of destruction, damage or looting. A joint initiative of the governments of France and the United Arab Emirates, its board of directors includes representatives of Saudi Arabia, Kuwait, Egypt, Morocco, China, international institutions, and private donors.

On October 29, 2019, at a ceremony in New York in which Princess Dana Firas of Jordan received the 2019 Watch Award, the World Monuments Fund bestowed upon Kaplan the Hadrian Award, a recognition established in 1988 to honor international leaders who have advanced the preservation of world art and architecture.

Conservation
Kaplan is the executive chairman of Panthera Corporation, a charity which he and his wife co-founded with Alan Rabinowitz in 2006. Panthera is devoted to preserving the big cats and their ecosystems and has been recognized as a leading force in felid conservation. Conservationist Doug Tompkins has referred to Panthera as "the foremost big cat conservation organization in the world," with National Geographic saying Panthera "represents the most comprehensive effort of its kind in wildcat conservation." For his work as an environmentalist, Kaplan was the recipient of the "Hero of the Year Award" by the IWFF in 2012. In an interview with David Rubenstein, part of Bloomberg's "Peer-to-Peer Conversations" series, Kaplan said, "If I have one passion, which is even greater than Rembrandt, it would be wildlife conservation..." In an interview with Sotheby's, Kaplan connected his two passions: "I see the common denominator between the power of a Rembrandt and the power of when you first encounter a tiger in the wild. It's beauty."

Kaplan and his wife Dafna helped establish a felid conservation program at Oxford University in collaboration with David MacDonald. In 2009, the couple endowed the Recanati-Kaplan Center at Oxford University's Wildlife Conservation Research Unit, the WildCRU, and the university's Postgraduate Diploma in International Wildlife Conservation Practice, which offers young conservationists from developing countries access to training at Oxford. In February 2012, Oxford's WildCRU was awarded the Queen's Anniversary Prize for Higher Education in recognition of WildCRU's outstanding work in wildlife and environmental conservation. In July 2015, a trophy hunter killed Cecil the lion, who was being studied by the WildCRU's Kaplan-funded Hwange Lion Research Project in Zimbabwe.

The Kaplans also founded the Orianne Society, focused on the conservation of the eastern indigo snake and its habitat, the last remaining long-leaf pine forests of the Southeastern United States. As part of this effort, the Kaplans created the Orianne Indigo Snake Preserve in Georgia through the purchase and donation of 2,500 acres of the snake’s winter habitat. In recognition for their work in wildlife conservation, in 2014 the Kaplans were awarded the New Species Award, and the naming of the newly discovered Orianne's Tree Snake, by the African Rainforest Conservancy.

In October 2017, the Persian Wildlife Heritage Foundation (PWHF), a conservation organization based in Iran, severed ties with Panthera in response to the 2017 UANI speech Kaplan had made about the Iranian government. In a letter they sent to Panthera: “His allegations about our country are absolutely baseless and his statements are insulting to our country and its people,” the letter continued. “We are very sorry to see personal politics have a negative impact on conservation, but these are unusual times.” The activists ended up getting arrested by the Iranian government under charges of treason, though they have maintained their innocence since.

On November 12, 2018, at the inaugural Paris Peace Forum, Kaplan launched the Indian Ocean Tortoise Alliance (IOTA), a Seychelles-based initiative dedicated to the conservation of the Aldabra tortoise and its rewilding in the other countries where it previously existed.

In 2020, Panthera launched a campaign called "Leopard Spotted" to encourage wearers of leopard print to promote awareness of the animal's plight on social media and donate to conservation efforts via a royalties system. Kaplan told The New Yorker, "We're not interested in discouraging people from using leopard print. To the contrary, what we want to do is make people understand that, while celebrating the leopard, they can also give back. If royalties were paid for any fashion statement like this, there would be more than enough money to save the leopard."

Distinctions
In March 2014, Kaplan was awarded the rank of Chevalier in the Ordre national de la Légion d'honneur of France, the country's highest civilian distinction. In presenting the decoration, the French Ambassador to the United States, François Delattre, said of Kaplan: "Through your multifaceted life and your support for an incredible array of causes, I believe you are the very definition of a game changer and Renaissance man - a young Renaissance man: as Chairman of the Y, as an environmentalist in Brazil, as an entrepreneur, a historian, a philanthropist, an art collector and a politically engaged individual."

In March 2017, Kaplan was decorated as a Commandeur in the Ordre des Arts et des Lettres by France's Minister of Culture, Audrey Azoulay, at a ceremony at the Louvre Museum. The award was given in recognition of the Kaplan family’s contribution to the arts in France as well as globally.

In September 2018, Kaplan was awarded the rank of Officer in the Order of Orange-Nassau for his efforts in disseminating Dutch culture and building bridges between people through art. Renée Jones-Bos, Ambassador of the Netherlands to Russia, presented the distinction to Kaplan in the Saint Petersburg office of Mikhail Piotrovsky, Director of the Hermitage Museum.

Personal life
Kaplan is married to Dafna Recanati Kaplan, daughter of Israeli artist Mira Recanati and investor Leon Recanati. They have three children.

References

External links
The Leiden Collection within Google Arts & Culture

1962 births
Living people
Activists from New York City
American billionaires
American conservationists
American investors
Alumni of the University of Oxford
Businesspeople from New York City
Jewish American art collectors
Jewish American philanthropists
Recanati family
21st-century American Jews
Alumni of Institut Le Rosey